Charles Street is the name of a north-south street in the city center of Boston, Massachusetts. It begins in the north at Leverett Circle, where it connects with Nashua Street and Monsignor O'Brien Highway.  Science Park station on the MBTA Green Line is located there.  Charles Street runs south and gives its name to the Charles/MGH station on the MBTA Red Line, connecting via the Charles Circle rotary to Cambridge Street and the Longfellow Bridge which leads to Cambridge. This segment is a one-way street, with traffic heading northwards.

From Charles Circle, the street heads further south as a one-way southbound thoroughfare, and forms the primary commercial spine of the affluent neighborhood of Beacon Hill. As it crosses Beacon Street, the direction of one-way traffic reverts to northbound, and the street widens to form the boundary between Boston Common and the Boston Public Garden.

Beyond Boylston Street, which forms the southern boundary of the parks, the street continues as Charles Street South (formerly Carver Street), terminating at Tremont Street just south of the Theatre District.

The street is the start and finish point for the annual B.A.A. 10K race, first organised by the Boston Athletic Association in 2011.

Notable residents
 John Albion Andrew lived on Charles St., 1855-1867
 Annie Adams Fields, James T. Fields, Sarah Orne Jewett (site of 148 Charles St.)
 Lucretia Peabody Hale (127 Charles St.)
 Davide Rossi (143 Charles St.)
 Edgar Allan Poe was born at 62 Carver Street, since renamed to Charles Street South

In film
Part of Martin Scorsese's 2006 film The Departed was filmed along Charles Street in Beacon Hill.

See also

 Boston Common
 Boston Public Garden
 Charles Street Jail
 Charles Street Meeting House
 Sevens Ale House

Image gallery

References

External links
 Library of Congress, Historic American Buildings Survey. 20th-century photos of house (built circa 1874), "one of the last single-family bow-fronted rowhouses to be built in Boston. This structure is included in the South End Historic District."
 https://www.flickr.com/photos/mit-libraries/3385484394/
 https://www.flickr.com/photos/jeffandfazia/3731460044/
 https://www.flickr.com/photos/galahad/85003442/
 https://www.flickr.com/photos/shutterscript/3086139769/

Streets in Boston
Beacon Hill, Boston
West End, Boston